Elinzanetant (developmental code names BAY-3427080 GSK-1144814, NT-814) is an orally active small-molecule neurokinin/tachykinin NK1 receptor and NK3 receptor antagonist which is under development by Bayer, GlaxoSmithKline, and NeRRe Therapeutics for the treatment of hot flashes and "sex hormone disorders". It has been found to relieve hot flashes in postmenopausal women and to dose-dependently suppress luteinizing hormone, estradiol, and progesterone levels in premenopausal women. As of August 2021, elinzanetant is in phase 2 clinical trials for hot flashes and "sex hormone disorders". It was also under development for the treatment of schizophrenia and opioid-related disorders, but development was discontinued for these uses.

See also 
 List of investigational sex-hormonal agents § Neurokinin/tachykinin receptor antagonists

References

External links 
 Elinzanetant - AdisInsight

Carboxamides
Antigonadotropins
Experimental drugs
Fluoroarenes
NK3 receptor antagonists
Oxazines
Pyrazines
Pyridines
Trifluoromethyl compounds